Vili Saarijärvi (born 15 May 1997) is a Finnish professional ice hockey defenceman for SCL Tigers of the Swiss National League (NL). He was drafted 73rd overall by the Detroit Red Wings in the 2015 NHL Entry Draft.

Playing career
During the 2014–15 season, Saarijärvi recorded six goals and 17 assists in 57 games for the Green Bay Gamblers, leading the Gamblers' defenceman in scoring, and finishing tied for 20th in scoring among all USHL defenceman. His first career USHL goal was a game-winning overtime goal on 4 October 2014, against the Chicago Steel. Following an outstanding season, Saarijärvi was named to the All-Rookie Second Team.

On 30 June 2015, Saarijärvi was drafted 9th overall by the Flint Firebirds in the CHL Import Draft. On 12 August 2015, the Firebirds signed Saarijärvi to an Ontario Hockey League (OHL) contract for the 2015–16 season. Saarijärvi played his first career OHL game with the Firebirds on 24 September 2015, where he recorded his first career OHL point, an assist, in a game against the Saginaw Spirit. On 24 June 2016, Saarijärvi was traded to the Mississauga Steelheads in exchange for Everett Clark, a second-round pick in the 2017 OHL Priority Selection, a fifth-round pick in the 2019 OHL Priority Selection and a conditional second-round pick in the 2023 OHL Priority Selection. During the 2016–17 season, he recorded 11 goals and 20 assists in 34 games for the Steelheads.

On 3 July 2015, the Detroit Red Wings signed Saarijärvi to a three-year, entry-level contract. During the 2017–18 season, in his first full professional season in North America, Saarijärvi split time between the ECHL's Toledo Walleye and the AHL's Grand Rapids Griffins. He made his AHL debut for the Griffins on 28 October 2017, and recorded his first career AHL point, an assist. In 10 games with the Walleye, he had two goals and four assists. In 42 games with the Griffins, he had 11 assists. During the 2018–19 season, in his second full professional season in North America, Saarijärvi recorded two goals, 14 assists, and a team-leading plus-19 rating, in 70 games for the Grand Rapids Griffins. He recorded his first career AHL goal on 20 October 2019 in a game against the Chicago Wolves.

On 30 November 2019, Saarijärvi was traded to the Arizona Coyotes in exchange for Eric Comrie. Prior to being traded, he recorded one assist in 13 games with the Griffins. On 2 December 2019, he was assigned to the Coyotes' AHL affiliate, the Tucson Roadrunners. He finished the season with six assists in 25 games for the Roadrunners.

On 15 May 2020, Saarijärvi signed with Lukko of the Finnish Liiga.

On 28 February 2023, the Coyotes traded Saarijärvi's rights to the Chicago Blackhawks in a three-team trade.

International play
Saarijärvi represented Finland at the 2015 IIHF World U18 Championships, where he led all defenceman in scoring, recording three goals and six assists in seven games, and won a silver medal. He was selected as the tournament's best defenceman and was named to the 2015 IIHF World U18 Championship All-Star Team.

Career statistics

Regular season and playoffs

International

References

External links
 

1997 births
Living people
Detroit Red Wings draft picks
Finnish expatriate ice hockey players in the United States
Finnish ice hockey defencemen
Flint Firebirds players
Grand Rapids Griffins players
Green Bay Gamblers players
Lukko players
Mississauga Steelheads players
People from Rovaniemi
SCL Tigers players
Sportspeople from Lapland (Finland)
Toledo Walleye players
Tucson Roadrunners players